Lilas Vasilikou is a football club in Euboea, Greece. Some years ago, they played in the Greek Third Division. The team was later disbanded and recreated, and plays in the topical championship.

NOTABLE GAMES

Lilas-Paok 0-0 in Greek Cup (first match)

Paok-Lilas 4-0 also in Greek Cup (the second match)

Lilas-Ethnikos Piraeus 1-1 in the Third National Division

Football clubs in Central Greece
Association football clubs established in 1957
1957 establishments in Greece
Sports clubs in Euboea